Yongxiu is a county under the administration of Jiujiang City in northern Jiangxi province, People's Republic of China, on the western shores of Poyang Lake.

Administrative divisions
Yongxiu County has 12 towns and 4 townships.

Towns (镇)
The county has 12 towns:

Townships (乡)
There are 4 townships:

Transport

The Beijing–Kowloon Railway and Nanchang–Jiujiang Intercity Railway traverse the county, and are served by the Yongxiu Railway Station.

Major highways passing through Yongxiu County are G70 Fuzhou–Yinchuan Expressway, China National Highway 105, and China National Highway 316.

Due to its importance in north-south travel in the province, Yongxiu was known as the "Gate of Hongdu" in ancient China.

Tourism
The spectacular Zhelin Reservoir lies in the northwest part of the county. The sacred Buddhist heaven Yunju Mountain stands in the southwest. The famous Poyang Lake Nature Reserve in the eastern part of the county.

Climate

References

External links

County-level divisions of Jiangxi
Jiujiang